D, or d, is the fourth letter in the Latin alphabet, used in the modern English alphabet, the alphabets of other western European languages and others worldwide. Its name in English is dee (pronounced ), plural dees.

History

The Semitic letter Dāleth may have developed from the logogram for a fish or a door. There are many different Egyptian hieroglyphs that might have inspired this. In Semitic, Ancient Greek and Latin, the letter represented ; in the Etruscan alphabet the letter was archaic, but still retained (see letter B). The equivalent Greek letter is Delta, Δ.

Architecture
The minuscule (lower-case) form of 'd' consists of a lower-story left bowl and a stem ascender. It most likely developed by gradual variations on the majuscule (capital) form 'D', and today now composed as a stem with a full lobe to the right. In handwriting, it was common to start the arc to the left of the vertical stroke, resulting in a serif at the top of the arc. This serif was extended while the rest of the letter was reduced, resulting in an angled stroke and loop. The angled stroke slowly developed into a vertical stroke.

Use in writing systems
 
In most languages that use the Latin alphabet, and in the International Phonetic Alphabet,  generally represents the voiced alveolar or voiced dental plosive . (See D with stroke and Dz (digraph).) In Fijian it represents a prenasalized stop . In some languages where voiceless unaspirated stops contrast with voiceless aspirated stops,  represents an unaspirated , while  represents an aspirated . Examples of such languages include Icelandic, Scottish Gaelic, Navajo and the Pinyin transliteration of Mandarin.

Other uses
 The Roman numeral D represents the number 500.
 D is the grade below C but above E in the school grading system.
 D is the International vehicle registration code for Germany (see also .de).
 In Cantonese: Because the lack of Unicode CJK support in the early computer system, many Hong Kongers and Singaporeans used the capitalized D to represent  (lit. a little).
 In the Gregory-Aland system for cataloging Biblical manuscripts, D can refer to documents in the Western text-type tradition, either Codex Bezae or Codex Claromontanus.
 d. is the standard abbreviation for the Penny (British pre-decimal coin) (from )

Related characters

Descendants and related characters in the Latin alphabet
Ɖ ɖ : African D
Ð ð : Latin letter Eth
D with diacritics: Đ đ Ꟈ ꟈ Ɗ ɗ Ḋ ḋ Ḍ ḍ Ḑ ḑ Ḓ ḓ Ď ď Ḏ ḏ
Phonetic symbols related to D:
 Symbols related to D used in the IPA:  
 Symbols related to D used in the Uralic Phonetic Alphabet: 
 Superscript IPA letters: 𐞋 𐞌 𐞍
 Other phonetic symbols related to D: ȡ ᵭ ᶁ ᶑ
Ƌ ƌ : D with topbar
𝼥 : D with mid-height left hook - Used by the British and Foreign Bible Society in the early 20th century for romanization of the Malayalam language.
Ꝺ ꝺ : Insular D is used in various phonetic contexts

Ancestors and siblings in other alphabets
𐤃 : Semitic letter Dalet, from which the following symbols originally derive
Δ δ : Greek letter Delta, from which the following symbols originally derive
 : Coptic letter Delta
Д д : Cyrillic letter De
𐌃 : Old Italic D, the ancestor of modern Latin D
 : Runic letter dagaz, which is possibly a descendant of Old Italic D
 Runic letter thurisaz, another possible descendant of Old Italic D
 : Gothic letter daaz, which derives from Greek Delta

Derived signs, symbols and abbreviations
₫ : Đồng sign
∂ : the partial derivative symbol,

Code points 
These are the code points for the forms of the letter in various systems

 1

Other representations

In British Sign Language (BSL), the letter 'd' is indicated by signing with the right hand held with the index and thumb extended and slightly curved, and the tip of the thumb and finger held against the extended index of the left hand.

Use as a number
In the hexadecimal (base 16) numbering system, D is a number that corresponds to the number 13 in decimal (base 10) counting. In the binary (base 2) numbering system, D is denoted by 1101.

References

External links

ISO basic Latin letters